84 may refer to: 
 84 (number)
 one of the years 84 BC, AD 84, 1984, AD 2084
 84 Lumber, a building materials supply company
 Eighty Four, Pennsylvania, an unincorporated census-designated place in Washington County, Pennsylvania, United States
 Seksendört, a Turkish pop group whose name means 84

See also
 
 List of highways numbered